Angana Roy is an Indian actress who primarily works in the Bengali and Hindi film industry. In 2003, she made her Bengali debut with the film Alo. She has also played roles in Bengali web series such as Shei Je Holud Pakhi, Paap, Tansener Tanpura, and Mohomaya.

Career
At the age of five, in 2003, Roy started her career with movie Alo, directed by Tarun Majumdar. After a long break, in 2018 she came back with the webseries Shei Je Holud Pakhi. After that she acted in a web series, Paap. In 2020, she played the character of Rohini in the webseries Tansener Tanpura. She is best known for her portrayal in the series. In 2022, she played the role of Rajlokkhi in the webseries Srikanto.She is going to be seen as a lead actress in the movie Lukochuri. Other than these, she has also acted in movies and webseries like Homecoming, Mrs. Undercover, Mohomaya and others. She has recently done a music video named Ga Chhunye Bolchhi with Anupam Roy.

Filmography

Films

Web series

Music video

References

External links
 

Living people
Place of birth missing (living people)
Bengali television actresses
Bengali actresses
Year of birth missing (living people)